The 2018–19 San Francisco Dons women's basketball team represents the University of San Francisco in the 2018–19 NCAA Division I women's basketball season. They were led by head coach Molly Goodenbour in her third season at San Francisco. The Dons, as members of the West Coast Conference, play their home games at War Memorial Gymnasium. They finished the season 7–24, 2–16 in WCC play to finish in a tie for ninth place. They advanced to the second round of the WCC women's tournament where they lost to Loyola Marymount.

Roster

Schedule and results

|-
!colspan=9 style=| Exhibition

|-
!colspan=9 style=| Non-conference regular season

|-
!colspan=9 style=| WCC regular season

|-
!colspan=9 style=| WCC Women's Tournament

See also
 2018–19 San Francisco Dons men's basketball team

References

San Francisco Dons women's basketball seasons
San Francisco
San Francisco Dons
San Francisco Dons